"When we were at war" (author's title "Song of the Hussar") is a poem by David Samoilov, included in his collection of poems, "Voices Beyond the Hills", in 1981–1985. The song gained popularity under the guise of an old Cossack song.

Lyrics

See also 

 Everything about that spring (song) (:ru:И всё о той весне)

References

External links 

 When we were at war. Kuban Cossack Choir (2014)

Russian songs
Cossack culture
Ukrainian songs